Joseph Dierickx (14 October 1865 – October 1959) was a Belgian painter. His work was part of the painting event in the art competition at the 1928 Summer Olympics.

References

1865 births
1959 deaths
20th-century Belgian painters
Belgian painters
Olympic competitors in art competitions
Artists from Brussels